Millennium High School may refer to:
 Millennium High School (Arizona), US
 Millennium High School (California), US
 Millennium High School (New York City), US

See also
 Millennium Art Academy, Bronx, New York, US